Snorri Helgason (born 1 June 1984) is an Icelandic musician. He was the lead singer of the group Sprengjuhöllin before establishing a solo career.

He has performed in the United States and Canada.

Discography
 I'm Gonna Put My Name on Your Door (2009)
 Winter Sun (2011)
 Autumn Skies (2013)
 Vittu til (2016)
 Margt býr í þokunni (2017)

References

External links
 
 

Snorri Helgason
Snorri Helgason
1984 births
Living people